The 2015 season was Stabæk's second season back in the Tippeligaen following their relegation in 2012, their 19th season in the top flight of Norwegian football and their second season with Bob Bradley as their manager. Stabæk finished the season in third place, qualifying for the 2016–17 UEFA Europa League First qualifying round. Stabæk also reached the Semifinals of the Norwegian Cup, where they were defeated by Rosenborg in extra time.

Squad

Out on loan 
.

Transfers

Winter

In:

Out:

Summer

In:

Out:

Friendlies

Simple Invitational

Competitions

Tippeligaen

Results summary

Results by round

Results

Table

Norwegian Cup

Squad statistics

Appearances and goals

|-
|colspan="14"|Players away from Stabæk on loan:

|-
|colspan="14"|Players who appeared for Stabæk no longer at the club:

|}

Goal scorers

Disciplinary record

References

Stabæk Fotball seasons
Stabaek